The 1973 Delaware Fightin' Blue Hens football team represented the University of Delaware as an independent during the 1973 NCAA Division II football season. The Hens completed the 85th season of Delaware football, and their first as members of the reorganized NCAA Division II. The Hens played their home games in at Delaware Stadium in Newark, Delaware. The 1973 team came off an undefeated 10–0 record from the previous season. The 1973 team was led by coach Tubby Raymond. The team finished the regular season with an 8–3 record and made the inaugural NCAA Division II playoffs. However, the Hens lost to Grambling, 17–8, in the first round, the Boardwalk Bowl.

Schedule

References

Delaware
Delaware Fightin' Blue Hens football seasons
Delaware Fightin' Blue Hens football